Prairie High School is a high school in Brush Prairie, Washington, United States.  Built in 1979, it is part of the Battle Ground School District of public schools in Clark County, located in the southwest region of the state.

Sports
Prairie is a member of the Washington Interscholastic Athletics Association (WIAA) and a participant in the Greater St. Helens 3A league.

The following teams have won state championships:
 Baseball: 1986, 1989
 Bowling: 2011
 Girls' basketball: 1993, 1994, 1998, 1999, 2003, 2012, 2019
 Girls' golf: 1993
 Softball:  2000, 2006
 Volleyball: 1998, 2012

Notable alumni
 Lance Bade, Olympic bronze medalist in trap shooting 1996
 Jaime Herrera Beutler, Congresswoman
 Dan Dickau, played in the NBA for several teams
 Alan Embree, MLB pitcher with the Colorado Rockies, Boston Red Sox and several other teams.
 Ana Matronic, born Anna Lynch, of the Scissor Sisters
 Richie Sexson, MLB, played for the Cleveland Indians and Seattle Mariners
 Zak Hill, Offensive Coordinator for Arizona State University
 Connor Jankowski, Biochemist at University of Washington, Princeton University
 Jordan Chiles, Olympic silver medalist in gymnastics 2020

References

External links
 Battle Ground School District No. 119
 Official website
 Battle Ground School District Report Card
 GSHL Football - Prairie High School

High schools in Clark County, Washington
Public high schools in Washington (state)
High schools in Vancouver, Washington
Educational institutions established in 1979